Local elections will be held in Belgrade by 30 April 2026 to elect members of the City Assembly.

Background 
In the 2022 Belgrade City Assembly election, the Serbian Progressive Party (SNS) won 48 seats, while the Socialist Party of Serbia–United Serbia coalition retained its 8 seats in the City Assembly. The election also saw the United for the Victory of Belgrade (UZPB) coalition winning 26 seats; the We Must coalition won 13 seats, while the National Democratic Alternative, Serbian Party Oathkeepers (SSZ), and Dveri also gained representation. Shortly after the election, Dragan Đilas, the leader of the Party of Freedom and Justice (SSP), which was a part of the UZPB coalition, met with Aleksandar Vučić, the president of Serbian Progressive Party, to discuss about the outcome of the election. This move received criticism from SSP's coalition partners, the People's Party (Narodna) and Democratic Party (DS), which ultimately led to the dissolution of the coalition.

After negotiations, Vuk Stanić, a member-elect, left the Movement for the Restoration of the Kingdom of Serbia, and voted in favour of Aleksandar Šapić becoming mayor in June 2022. Later in October 2022, the Ujedinjeni parliamentary group filed a proposal for dismissal of Šapić, citing alleged illegal legalisation of the extension of an apartment at Bežanija. This proposal was also supported from Narodna, DS, Moramo, and Dveri, however it failed as only 44 members voiced their support of it. During this period, Marija Vukomirović and Stefan Jovanović, who were affiliated with SSZ, left the party, stating their disapproval of the party's leader, Milica Đurđević Stamenkovski. Stanić, Vukomirović, and Jovanović defected to SNS in February 2023.

Electoral system 
Local elections in Belgrade are held under a proportional representation system. Voters in Belgrade determine the composition of the City Assembly, which in turn elects the mayor. Shortly prior the election, parties must submit a ballot list and their ballot leader. One mandate of a mayor and an elected member of the City Assembly lasts four years.

Political parties 

The table below lists political parties represented in the City Assembly of Belgrade after the 2022 election.

Current composition

Opinion polls 
According to an opinion poll that was conducted by Demostat in December 2022, 50% of the voters would vote for government parties, 33% of the voters would vote for centrist and left-leaning opposition parties, while 17% of the voters would vote for opposition parties that lean to the right.

Notes

References 

Future elections in Europe
Elections in Belgrade
Local elections in Serbia